Carl Friedrich Gauss (1777–1855) was a German mathematician and physicist.

Gauss may also refer to:

Science and technology
 Gauss (unit), a unit of magnetic flux density or magnetic induction
 Gauss (crater), a crater on the moon
 GAUSS (software), a matrix programming language for mathematics

Other uses
 Gauss (ship), a German research ship
 Gauss Speaker Company an American company that made loudspeakers
 Gauss (surname)

See also
 Gauss rifle, a type of magnetic gun
 Gauss's law of electric fields
 List of things named after Carl Friedrich Gauss